Max Pohl (10 December 1855 – 7 April 1935) was an Austrian stage and film actor.

Selected filmography
 The Black Tulip Festival (1920)
 The Marquise of Armiani (1920)
 The Fear of Women (1921)
 The Oath of Stephan Huller (1921)
 Monna Vanna (1922)
 Lucrezia Borgia (1922)
 Man by the Wayside (1923)
 The Hungarian Princess (1923)
 Living Buddhas (1925)
 Queen Louise (1927)
 The Murderer Dimitri Karamazov (1931)
 The Brothers Karamazov (1931)

References

Bibliography
 Glen W. Gadberry. Theatre in the Third Reich, the Prewar Years. Greenwood Publishing, 1995.

External links

1855 births
1935 deaths
Austrian male stage actors
Austrian male film actors
Austrian male silent film actors
19th-century Austrian male actors
20th-century Austrian male actors
People from Mikulov